The Brothers' Woman (Swedish: Brödernas kvinna) is a 1943 Swedish drama film directed by Gösta Cederlund and starring Viveca Lindfors, Arnold Sjöstrand and Gunnar Sjöberg. It was shot at the  Centrumateljéerna Studios in Stockholm. The film's sets were designed by the art director Bertil Duroj. Is is based on the 1939 novel of the same title by Ebba Richert.

Synopsis
On the island of Gotland a farmer marries Emma an attractive young woman from Visby. However she becomes involved with his brother and eventually falls pregnant to him.

Cast
 Viveca Lindfors as Emma
 Arnold Sjöstrand as 	Ragnar Botvide
 Gunnar Sjöberg as 	Nicklas Botvide
 Britta Holmberg as 	Agnes
 Artur Rolén as 	Jaken
 Carl Ström as 	Isaken
 Anna Olin as 	Sanna 
 Helga Brofeldt as 	Ann-Kajsa
 Gösta Cederlund as 	Vicar
 Nils Ekman as 	Klemens, teacher 
 Axel Högel as 	Doctor 
 Anders Nyström as 	Lill-Nicklas 
 Henrik Schildt as 	Wallin, preacher 
 Artur Cederborgh as 	Guest at the wedding
 Lillie Wästfeldt as 	Guest at the wedding
 Jullan Jonsson as 	Cook at the wedding 
 Birger Åsander as 	Drunk man

References

Bibliography 
 Qvist, Per Olov & von Bagh, Peter. Guide to the Cinema of Sweden and Finland. Greenwood Publishing Group, 2000.
 Wallengren, Ann-Kristin.  Welcome Home Mr Swanson: Swedish Emigrants and Swedishness on Film. Nordic Academic Press, 2014.

External links 
 

1943 films
Swedish drama films
1943 drama films
1940s Swedish-language films
Films directed by Gösta Cederlund
Swedish black-and-white films
Films based on Swedish novels
1940s Swedish films